Beta is an Italian motorcycle manufacturer, specialising in off-road motorcycles. Beta are best known for their popular observed trials bikes. In 2005, they launched a range of enduro motorcycles using KTM engines. In 2010 they launched the new RR series, with a new engine made in-house. Beta motorcycles have been used by world trials champions such as Jordi Tarrés, Dougie Lampkin, Albert Cabestany and Enduro riders Steve Holcombe and Brad Freeman. Production in 2018 was expected to be in excess of 20,000 motorcycles, ranging in size from 50 cc to 480 cc.

History

Beta has its origins in 1904 as a bicycle manufacturing company named "Società Giuseppe Bianchi",  originally based in the town of Via Bellariva and later moved to Florence. The name Beta comes from the initials of Bianchi, Enzo and Tosi, Arrigo who ran the company at that time. Currently the company is run by Lapo Bianchi great grand-son of Giuseppe Bianchi the company founder. The company started making motorcycles in 1948. Focusing on two-stroke street bikes through the 1950s and 1960s, the company began development and production of off-road motorcycles in the late 1960s with the introduction of the 100cc motocross model XC-100 in 1967. The off-road models were initially observed trials bikes. In 2004 Beta entered the 4-stroke enduro market with bikes using KTM motors. By the 2010s they were producing both two-stroke and four-stroke off-road bikes with Beta designed motors.

Notable Beta riders include Jim Pomeroy, Gilbert De Roover, Ivan Bessone and Jeremy Van Horebeek in motocross, and Jordi Tarres and Dougie Lampkin in observed trials. Beta motorcycle riders Steve Holcombe and Brad Freeman collectively have won the last five (2017 - 2021) EnduroGP Enduro World Championships.

Trials models

Beta have produced motorcycles for observed trials since the early 1980s and are now one of the leading manufacturers. All trials bikes use Beta's in-house design engines.

 TR240 (1983–84)  First trials model, twinshock suspension 125cc, 200cc engines, the majority with reed valve induction.

 TR32, (1984–85) Air-cooled, monoshock model, produced in parallel with the twinshock model, same engine as TR240
 TR33, (1985–86)
 TR34, (1986-1989) Very successful trials model, stripey paintwork, 125cc - 260cc engines
 TR35, (1989–1991) Air-cooled engine series
 Zero, (1989–1992) Water-cooled monoshock
 Synt, (1992-194) Water-cooled monoshock
 SuperTrial, (1992–93) Air-cooled engine
 Gara, (1993–94)
 Techno, (1994-1999) 125cc version from 1995
 Rev-3, (1999–2008) 2-stroke trials
 Rev-4, (2007–08) 4-stroke trials
 Evo, (2009–present) 2-stroke and 4-stroke

Motocross models 
For 2021 Beta introduced the 300 RX motocross bike with a 19" rear wheel and other enhancements geared to the MX market. They also entered 2021 and 2022 MXGP series with a new 450 RX.

Enduro models

2004 - 2009 KTM Motors
Introduced in 2004 the chrome-moly framed enduro bikes (with KTM 250, 400, 450, 525 RFS motors) came equipped with Nissin brakes and rotors, Marzocchi forks, and a Sachs rear shock.

For 2007 the RR models were upgraded with a removable clutch sub-cover, upgraded front fork settings, and a redesigned rear swing arm.

2008 introduced the RS models built for the American market. The RS model is the street legal version of the RR model and came in 400cc, 450cc and 525cc versions.

2009 saw the introduction of the first "Factory" or Race editions. The race edition included upgrades such as a titanium exhaust, Marzocchi closed cartridge forks, billet triple clamps and a carbon fiber skid plate. 2009 was the last year of the KTM motors.

2010 - 2014 1st gen Beta Motors
Starting in 2010 in-house designed carburated motors appeared in their enduro bikes. All 400cc, 450cc and 520cc (actually 498cc) four-strokes have DOHC, separate engine and transmission lubricants, Nissin brakes, Brembo hydraulic clutches, Excel Takasago rims and six-speed gear boxes.

2011 saw the introduction of the in-house motors in the RS (dual-sport) models and introduced the 350cc motor. RS bikes have slightly different frame geometry resulting shorter wheelbases (58.1 vs 58.7 for RRs) and lower seat heights (36.6 vs 36.8 for RRs). All RS dual-sport bikes sold in the United States come standard with the TrailTech Voyager GPS.

The 2012 motors were available in 350, 400, 450, and 498cc. 2012 also saw the introduction of the Sachs forks and rear shock on the RR models. A 2012 only cross country version of the 450 was offered with Marzocchi closed cartridge forks and a Sachs rear shock with a special link for longer travel.

2013 saw the introduction of the 300RR 2-stroke sporting Marzocchi closed cartridge forks and a Sachs rear shock. The 350 RS sported 45mm Marzocchi USD forks.

2014 saw the addition of a 250cc motor to the RR 2-stroke line. The 2014 "Race Edition" bikes made use of 48mm Marcocchi closed cartridge forks.

2015 - 2019 Perfect Displacement Motors
2015 saw the introduction of new engine displacements. The 350 remained the same. The 400 was reduced to 390, the 450 reduced to 430 and the 498 was reduced to 480 to provide the same horsepower and torque as the 2014 models yet with more “useable” power. Beta engineers call these the "perfect displacements.” The RS (dual-sport) models were available in 390, 430 and 500 only. 2015 also saw the introduction of the x-trainer 300cc 2-stroke employing oil injection. Fuel injection was introduced to the 350cc 4-stroke.

2016 saw the addition of the 350 to the RS line. Oil injection was added to the 250 and 300 2-strokes. The remaining 4-strokes 390, 430 and 480/500 received fuel injection. All 4-stroke models now come with plastic skid plates and translucent fuel tanks.

In 2017 all bikes gained the convenient push button seats. The RS models are rebranded RR-S and gained USFS spark arrestors. The bikes designated RR-S are full-on versions of their electric start, fuel-injected, four-stroke dirt bikes, outfitted with the bare minimum required for a license plate. RR race edition bikes gained the new Sachs closed cartridge forks. Beta also introduced Lithium Ion batteries while the RR-S models became electric start only with the option of an add-on kick starter.

2019 saw the introduction of the carburetor equipped 200 to the RR 2-stroke line. All models of the RR line 200, 250 and 300 gained electric start. The 125 RR-S gained electric start while 125 RR remained kick start only.

Through 2019 all RR-S models included an AGM battery, a 200W stator, handlebar-mounted ignition map switch, fold-away mirrors, and a factory-installed radiator fan. The RR models are the "race editions" featuring performance tweaks and stiffer suspensions but no street gear.

2020 - present
For the 2020 model year Beta revamped their "Perfect Displacement" four-stroke once again. The new motors alter the crank shaft position and add twin fuel injectors allowing implementation of specialized EFI mapping to increase engine performance and mixture control. The 250cc and 300cc 2-stroke motors (including X-trainers) gained a counter-balancer. The "Race Edition" RR bikes were offered with optional Gold KYB closed cartridge forks.

The 2021 200 RR Race Edition, drops the oil injection in favor of pre-mix to shed weight.

There are currently eleven two-stroke and nine four-stroke models.

Trail models 

The Alp trail motorcycle models use air-cooled Suzuki DR-model engines and due to a low seat height have a reputation of being easy to ride. 
 Alp 4T 125 cc (2000-discontinued) Basic learner trials/trailbike.
 Alp 4T 200 cc.(2000–Present) Same 125 chassis with a 200cc four stroke.
 Alp 4.0 350 cc (2003–Present)

Street
Starting in 2018 Beta offered the 2018 125 RR-S SUPER MOTO.

See also

 List of scooters
 Scooter (motorcycle)
 List of scooter manufacturers
 List of Italian companies
 List of motorcycle manufacturers, Italy

Notes

References

External links
 Beta Official site.
 Beta Racing UK Uk based Beta Trials site.
 www.betausa.com US site.
 www.betarider.org Beta Riders Club

Vehicle manufacturing companies established in 1904
Italian companies established in 1904
Motorcycle manufacturers of Italy
Motorcycle trials
Italian brands
Manufacturing companies based in Florence